Arthur Shadwell (September 1854 – March 1936) was a British physician and author, specialising in public health, temperance, and wider problems of economics and politics.

Career
Arthur Shadwell was an alumnus of Uppingham School and Keble College, Oxford where he matriculated in 1874. He graduated B.A. in 1882, and B.Med.and M.A. in 1883. He completed his clinical training at Saint Bartholomew's Hospital, and became a Fellow of the Royal College of Physicians.

Shadwell was appointed as a medical advisor to the Metropolitan Asylums Board in 1900. In September 1908 he was appointed a trustee for the Queen Victoria Jubilee Institute of Nurses. Shadwell had worked as an assistant physician in Brighton at the Sussex County Hospital, before he decided to pursue his dream of writing on public health, temperance, and wider problems of economics and politics, He wrote numerous books and articles for publications like Maclean's, and in 1892 he was selected to be a special correspondent for The Times. After finishing his role as a specialist correspondent for The Times, he continued to work for them as a contributor to The Times Literary Supplement. During 1925-26 Shadwell gave the Fitzpatrick Lecture at the Royal College of Physicians and regularly gave talks to other institutions.

Shadwell's work is still quoted by fellow writers and scholars.

Personal life
Shadwell was born in Langton, Yorkshire on the 21 September 1854 to The Reverend Arthur Shadwell.

Shadwell was married twice with his first wife being Bertha James and his second wife being Alice Louise Theobald. Shadwell lived in Ham Common, London where he was buried at St Andrews Church.

Bibliography
 1883 The Architectural History of the City of Rome, Based on J.H. Parker's "Archaeology of Rome" For the Use of Students
 1896 The Economic Aspects of the Bicycle
 1898 The Tallerman Treatment by Superheated Dry Air in Rheumatism, Gout, Rheumatic Arthritis, Stiff and Painful Joints, Sprains, Sciatica, and Other Affections: Case Notes and Medical Reports with Numerous Illustrations 
 1899 The London Water Supply  
 1909 Industrial Efficiency
 1912 An Encyclopædia of Industrialism  
 1915 Drink, Temperance and Legislation  
 1923 Drink in 1914-1922 A Lesson in Control  
 1925 The Socialist Movement, 1824-1924 ASIN B000L9HQ0W <ref>{{cite web|url=https://www.cambridge.org/core/journals/american-political-science-review/article/abs/the-socialist-movement-by-shadwellarthur-london-philip-allan-and-co1925-two-volumes-pp-212-217-state-experiments-in-australia-and-new-zealand-by-reevesw-pember-new-york-e-p-dutton-and-co1925-two-volumes-pp-391-367/EDC3C419577F6805791B2E0616274173|title=The Socialist Movement. By Arthur Shadwell. (London: Philip Allan and Co.1925. Two volumes. Pp. 212; 217.) - State Experiments in Australia and New Zealand. By W. Pember Reeves. (New York: E. P. Dutton and Co.1925. Two volumes. Pp. 391; 367.)|author=Paul H. Douglas|website=Cambridge University Press|access-date=28 January 2021}}</ref>
 1926 The Breakdown of Socialism ASIN B002OJFWNU
 1929 Typhoeus, Or The Future Of Socialism'' ASIN B000L6GX1I

References

Bartleby. (n.d.). Retrieved from The Library of the World's Best Literature. An Anthology in Thirty Volumes.: http://www.bartleby.com/library/readersdigest/1033.html
Brown, G. H. (n.d.). Lives of the fellows. Retrieved from Royal College of Physicians : https://history.rcplondon.ac.uk/inspiring-physicians/arthur-shadwell

1854 births
1936 deaths
Alumni of Keble College, Oxford
Fellows of the Royal College of Physicians
People educated at Uppingham School